Louis-Joseph Beaussier de Lisle (15 March 1701 – June 4, 1765) was a career naval officer from one of the oldest families of Toulon, France. 

Beaussier had a long and varied naval career and by 1750 had made captain. He also was made a knight of the Order of Saint Louis. In 1756, he brought six ships to Quebec carrying Montcalm and 1,300 troops as reinforcements. Returning to France, he engaged two English ships at Fort Louisbourg and badly damaged them. In 1758, he commanded a ship in a squadron that sailed to Louisbourg to assist governor Drucour in its defence. After the Siege of Louisbourg, the fortress fell to the English on July 27, 1758 and Beaussier was taken prisoner with the rest of the garrison.

External links 
 
 Quebec History - Louis-Joseph Beaussier de Lisle

Beaussier, Louis-Joseph
Beaussier, Louis-Joseph
Beaussier, Louis-Joseph
Knights of the Order of Saint Louis